The 1907 Chicago Maroons football team was an American football team that represented the University of Chicago during the 1907 college football season.  In their 16th season under head coach Amos Alonzo Stagg, the Maroons compiled a 4–1 record, finished in first place in the Western Conference with a 4–0 record against conference opponents, and outscored all opponents by a combined total of 147 to 42.

Schedule

Roster

Head coach: Amos Alonzo Stagg (16th year at Chicago)

References

Chicago
Chicago Maroons football seasons
Big Ten Conference football champion seasons
Chicago Maroons football